Arman is an rural locality (a settlement) in Olsky District of Magadan Oblast, Russia. Population:

Geography

Arman is located near the Taui Bay, west of the mouth of the Arman.

History
An Evenian settlement in the place of today's place was mentioned in Russian documents of the late 17th century. The name of the place and river is of Even origin and means, among other things, "spring".

During the Soviet period, a fishing, hunting and agricultural cooperative was established there, which was converted into one of the most important collective farms in the region in 1932. In 1965, Arman received urban-type settlement status, but has been a rural locality again since 2013.

References

Rural localities in Magadan Oblast